Football Manager 2019 is a football management simulation video game developed by Sports Interactive and published by Sega which was released worldwide in November 2018 for Microsoft Windows, macOS and Nintendo Switch.

Gameplay
FM19 features similar gameplay to that of the Football Manager series. Gameplay consists of taking charge of an association football team (club or nation) as the team manager. Players can sign footballers to contracts, manage club finances and give team talks to players. FM19 is a simulation of real-world management, with the manager being judged on various factors by the club's AI owners and board.

In FM19, the game features new expanded modes, featuring the addition of video assistant referees (VAR) in tournaments where it is used in the real world (the 2022 FIFA World Cup, for example). FM19 also features an overhaul to the existing training mechanic, allowing more in-depth training abilities. This version also features updated teams, including — as a first for the series — the licence to the three Bundesliga divisions.

Playable leagues 
The game offers playable teams in 52 countries across five of the world's continents: Africa, Asia (including Australia), Europe, North America and South America. Coverage is heavily slanted towards European teams, with 34 of its 51 countries having playable leagues, while South Africa is the only country of Africa's total 54 that is covered.

25 leagues (across 12 countries) were fully licensed for the game, as was KNVB ("Team Holland"). Notably, the German national team was not included in the game.

Release
On 6 August 2018, developer Sports Interactive released a trailer for the release of the game, which announced the game's release date as 2 November 2018. Although the series had a regular Linux edition since November 2013, Football Manager 2019 will not have a Linux release. A beta release of the game was made available on 21 October 2018. The Personal Computer versions for Mac and Windows was later released on 2 November 2018; and later FM Touch released for Nintendo Switch on 27 November 2018 in Europe and Australia.

A mobile and tablet version of the game entitled Football Manager Mobile 2019 was also released with the PC version, on 2 November 2018.

Reception 

Football Manager 2019 received "generally favorable" reviews while Football Manager 2019 Touch for Switch received "mixed or average" reviews according to review aggregator Metacritic.

PC Gamer strongly praised the game for its improvement on previous entries, stating, "Football Manager returns with a kitbag full of new and overhauled features. It's the best at what it does, and FM 19 is the best it's ever been." GameSpot praised the manner in which the game provided the player with increased flexibility and command while criticizing its lack of accessibility. PCGamesN wrote positively about the game's balance being great on launch, stating, "Sports Interactive has exposed more of the game’s workings to players than ever. It feels both fresh and familiar at the same time, while being the best FM has ever played on day one." GamesRadar+ praised the game for its freshness, user interface, and accessibility while criticizing it for its press conferences and match engine.

References

External links

2019
Sega video games
Windows games
MacOS games
Video games developed in the United Kingdom
2018 video games
Nintendo Switch games